The Battle of Stone Corral, also known as the Gunfight at Stone Corral, occurred in June 1893 and was the final shootout during the pursuit of the Sontag-Evans Gang. After months of searching and several previous encounters, a small posse under the command of Marshal George E. Gard ambushed John Sontag and Chris Evans at a corral near Visalia, California.

See also

 List of Old West gunfights

External links
 Stone Corral Monument

References

American Old West gunfights
History of Tulare County, California
1893 in California
Conflicts in 1893
Visalia, California
June 1893 events